Harvey Lowe (30 October 1918 – 11 March 2009) was a Canadian radio presenter and world yo-yo champion.

Early life
Lowe was born in Victoria, British Columbia, Canada in 1918, the youngest of eight daughters and two sons of his parents. Wanting more male children, Lowe's father had also had a son with his concubine, making Lowe the 11th child in the family. His father died when Lowe was three and he was subsequently raised by his father's concubine while his mother supported the family by sewing.

Yo-yo champion
Lowe bought his first yo-yo in 1931 for 35 cents. He began entering and winning local contests. Promoter Irving Cook noticed Lowe's talent and took him to London, paying his mother $25 each month and providing a tutor for him. Lowe won the first World Yo-Yo Contest at the Empire Theatre on 12 September 1932. He remained in Europe until 1934, mastering over 2000 tricks. His fame provided him with the opportunity to befriend famous people such as the Prince of Wales, Fats Waller and Laurel and Hardy.  After his initial burst of fame with the toy ended, Lowe still performed regularly on local stages.  Furthermore, in the 1960s, he was invited onto The Smothers Brothers Comedy Hour when Tom Smothers created his Yo-Yo Man character and appeared in a sketch as the character's guru.

In 2005 Lowe was inducted into the American Yo-Yo Association Hall of Fame. His famous yo-yo is housed in the National Yo-Yo Museum in Chico, California.

Later career
On his return from Europe in 1934, Lowe entered high school. Then, in 1937, Lowe's mother sent him to Shanghai to learn the Chinese language. He went on to graduate from a Chinese university with a business degree. Lowe remained in China until Mao Zedong established the People's Republic of China in 1949, when Lowe returned to Canada.

After purchasing a typewriter, Lowe began writing about his experiences in China. The concept evolved into a weekly radio program Call of China on CJOR which ran for fourteen years.

Lowe held a variety of positions throughout his lifetime, including doorman at a gambling club, owner of the Smilin' Buddha Cabaret, stage manager at the Marco Polo and a restaurateur involved with Chinatown restaurants like the Bamboo Terrace, the Kingsland and the Asia Gardens. He also taught actress Julie Christie how to smoke opium for her role in the movie McCabe & Mrs. Miller.

References

External links
Yo-yo king dies at 90
Interview with Harvey Lowe, Grand Marshal of the 2000 World Yo-yo Contest 
The Cheerio Yo-Yo Company at yoyowiki.org
CBC The Late Show documentary with interviews
YoYoRadio Internet radio show interview with Harvey Lowe
 

1918 births
2009 deaths
Canadian people of Chinese descent
People from Victoria, British Columbia
Yo-yo performers